Catephia melanica is a species of moth of the  family Erebidae. It is found in Nepal and India (Sikkim).

References

Catephia
Moths described in 1926
Moths of Asia